"House'llelujah" is a 2010 song by Belgian singer Stromae, released on 17 May 2010 as a promo-single for his album Cheese, on which it was included. The song only charted in Belgium. House'llelujah is derived from Hallelujah. He performed the song live at The Dome 55 in Hannover, Germany on 27 August 2010.

Music video
The official music video to the song was uploaded to YouTube by Stromae on 15 September 2010. The video shows Stromae as a priest of a religion based around house music. The congregation watches him sing on a large screen while initially standing still and, later, starting to sing and dance.

Personnel
Lead vocals
Stromae
Production
Mosaert - producer

Track listings
House'llelujah (3:59)

Charts

References

External links
 

2010 singles
Stromae songs
2010 songs
Songs written by Stromae